Beardsmore is a surname. Notable people with the surname include:

Colin Beardsmore (born 1978), Canadian ice hockey player
Russell Beardsmore (born 1968), British footballer
Sue Beardsmore (born 1955), British television presenter